Alangiri is a  village in the Egra I CD block in the Egra subdivision of the Purba Medinipur district in the state of West Bengal, India.

Geography

Location

Urbanisation
96.96% of the population of Egra subdivision live in the rural areas. Only 3.04% of the population live in the urban areas, and that is the lowest proportion of urban population amongst the four subdivisions in Purba Medinipur district.

Note: The map alongside presents some of the notable locations in the subdivision. All places marked in the map are linked in the larger full screen map.

Demographics
According to the 2011 Census of India, Alangiri had a total population of 6,099, of which 3,186 (52%) were males and 2,913 (48%) were females. There were 628 persons in the age range of 0–6 years. The total number of literate persons in Alangiri was 4,438 (81.12% of the population over 6 years).

Culture
David J. McCutchion mentions:
 The Gokulananda Kisora temple is an eka-ratna with rekha tower of the tall south Midnapore type, measuring 17’ 8 x 15’ 5” plain with a large attached  porch measuring 21’ 1’’ x 13’ 10” with terracotta lotuses. (The ruinous Lakshmi temple is also of this type).
 The Raghunatha temple is a West Bengal nava-ratna with rigged turrets measuring 29’ square, with rich terracotta façade, construction begun in 1810. 
 The Rasamancha of Raghunatha is an octagonal structure with straight cornices following the nava-ratna style with ‘baroque’ vase pinnacles, measuring 5’ 3” having terracotta on eight sides.

Alangiri picture gallery

References

External links

Villages in Purba Medinipur district